Neptis rogersi is a butterfly in the family Nymphalidae. It is found along the coasts of Kenya and Tanzania. The habitat consists of coastal forests.

The larvae feed on Paullinia pinnata and Alchornea cordifolia.

References

Butterflies described in 1921
rogersi